Andrea Boffelli (born 14 March 1997) is an Italian footballer who plays as a defender for  club Pro Patria.

Club career
He made his Serie C debut for Mestre on 27 August 2017 in a game against Teramo.

After playing for Pro Patria on loan for two years, on 7 August 2020 he signed a 3-year contract with the club.

References

External links
 

1997 births
Living people
Sportspeople from the Province of Bergamo
Footballers from Lombardy
Italian footballers
Association football defenders
Serie C players
Serie D players
Atalanta B.C. players
A.C. Ponte San Pietro Isola S.S.D. players
A.C. Mestre players
Aurora Pro Patria 1919 players